Manuel Córdova-Rios (November 22, 1887 – November 22, 1978) was a vegetalista (herbalist) of the upper Amazon, and the subject of several popular books.

As a teenage mestizo of Iquitos he joined a company's work party to set up camp in the neighboring Amazon forest. They commercially cut rubber trees. He was, however, captured by a native tribe, and apparently lived among them for seven years. The elderly chief taught him in intensive private sessions traditional tribal knowledge: medicinal plants of the jungle, and ways of leadership. The small tribe knew skills for hunting in the jungle, which he learned well, acquiring the name Ino Moxo (black jaguar). The chief also led night-long group sessions under the influence of ayahuasca to sharpen prowess in the hunt. After the chief's death, Córdova was acknowledged as leader of the tribe for some years.

He then returned to local Peruvian life, married and raised a family. Eventually he became well known in the upper Amazon for his success as a curandero (healer), due to his knowledge and use of the chief's herbal teachings. Also he regularly sent medicinal plants to New York.

In the early 1960s he met an American forester, Bruce Lamb (1913–1993), a veteran of many years in the Amazon. Lamb then wrote Córdoba's life story in Wizard of the Upper Amazon (1971), and about his healing arts in Rio Tigre and Beyond (1985). Both books sold well and drew academic interest, acclaim, and some controversy. Later, a Peruvian poet-novelist and an American poet each published literary works focused on Córdova.

Early years

Amazon youth and caucho 

Until the age of twelve Manuel Córdova-Ríos attended schools in Iquitos his birthplace. The major Peruvian city on the Amazon, it then had perhaps 40,000 inhabitants. His Uru mother came from Moyobamba, a town west of Iquitos in the Andes foothills between the Río Marañón and Río Huallaga. His father worked in the surrounding forest as a tapper or cutter of wild rubber trees. His origins lay near Arequipa (a provincial capital near the ocean and far to the south).

The thriving Amazon trade in rubber (Sp: caucho) had come upriver to Iquitos circa 1880 from Brazil. Eventually his mother let him go with his elder sister Mariana and her husband Lino Vela into the hinterland to learn the booming rubber business. In the small town of Iberia on the Río Tapiche the couple's trading post served rubber tappers, who would bring in their harvest of latex to sell, as well as to buy gear and supplies. Before long young Manuel went further into the bush, by boat with a company of four others under Roque to a remote, makeshift caucho camp by the Río Juruá near the Peru–Brazil border. From here they could fan out into the unexploited forest in search of wild rubber trees.

Captured by a forest tribe 
On a day when it was Manuel's turn to cook and clean camp, he was alone while the others hunted for rubber. Surprised suddenly by the deft appearance of a group of forest natives (about 15 in number), Manuel was quickly seized and nearby weapons removed. With hands bound, he was required to run at an accelerated pace along with the silent tribal party, through the forest southward for several days and nights, stopping only briefly. Exhausted and disoriented, he surmised that his fellow caucheros had been killed; he later noticed his captors with their weapons. After about nine days on foot, they reached a small village in a jungle clearing (called Xanadá he later learned) located near the Peruvian headwaters of the Río Purús. It was about 250 km. from the caucho camp. An elderly chief greeted him and expressed kindness toward him. His name was Xumu Nawa. Manuel was naturally apprehensive. Eventually the village came to accept him, and slowly Manuel began to be reconciled to his new situation; ceremonies were held. Village children became casual and friendly, and the chief started to teach him the tribal language.

Life in Huni Kui village 
Being young Manuel Córdova-Ríos, after adjustments, quickly took to the tribal ways of the Huni Kui ["real people" or "true, genuine people", also "chosen people"]. A readily apparent difference was that the Huni Kui for the most part went naked. Their home was the tropical rainforest, which Córdoba had only known from a Peruvian perspective. He learned their language and their hunting styles, ate the diet of cultivated vegetables, wild fruits and game meat, lived their village life, and went without clothes. He retained inwardly, however, a submerged but unresolved conflict, due to the supposed harm caused by his initial capture. The chief Xumu taught Manuel Córdova-Rios much traditional knowledge of the tribe, which constituted valuable lessons enriching Manuel's entire life. Here Xumu Nawa might be further described as a shaman, or as a curaca, a title for leaders used among tribes of the upper Amazon.

Ayahuasca and hunting 

A major occupation of the men was hunting, which provided a substantial part of the Huni Kui diet. Xumu the elderly chief would, periodically, lead the hunters in secluded, group sessions calculated to renew and improve their hunting skills. The preparation usually required, e.g., a purge of the bowels, followed by taking only selected foods, and sexual abstinence. In a clearing away from the village a dark-green drink was made mostly from vines of ayahuasca [HK: nixi honi] and chacruna leaves, boiled slowly over a low fire. It was poured into small palm-nut cups and given to the hunters, who sat encircling the fire. Accompanied softly by the others, the chief would begin singing his peculiar chants. At his discretion he'd employ the songs to alter the atmosphere of the gathering or modify the pace of the group.

The tribal hunters then entered into what may be described as a shared experience of vision. After an initial chaotic flux of organic images and designs, arabesques in blues and greens, a collective fantasy developed in which a 'parade' of birds and animals began to pass into the group's awareness. Following the chief's cue the hunters would shift the chant, enabling them to use the particular song (icaro) associated with each of the jungle creatures as it passed before them. Evidently the group had evolved this method to coordinate their visions, so that they could then collectively imagine a similar scene of forest life. Accordingly, following their group witness of the wild creatures one after another, each of the tribal members was better able to appreciate the instinctual nature of such an animal or a bird, and the stealth and techniques of their fellow hunters, all of which could be scrutinized and delicately appraised in each mind's eye. Several of such hunting scenes, later reconveyed in elaborated stories told after the session, might then be carefully assimilated. The experience naturally worked to coach each hunter to improve his skills, e.g., shooting arrows that hit their mark, or refashioning his tracking intuition.

This ayahuasca experience, which was from time to time repeated for the tribe's hunters, fascinated and enchanted the young initiate, Manuel Córdoba. By this process, the Huni Kui men worked together to sharpen and refresh the tribe's hunting skills. Afterwards, hunters divided into small groups and put to the test their newly enhanced ability to find and bag the forest's wild game, and so to increase each family's ability to survive. In one of these hunts, Nixi and Txaxo told Manuel how to pursue feral pigs and, after tracking a large band, shot arrows bringing down a few quick targets. Nixi and Txaxo further described roving habits of the forest pigs.

The hunters also maintained a tradition of reciting to each other well-known tribal legends of the hunt, as well as personal stories. Córdova often heard such stories told in gatherings, e.g., inside a thatched house by the fire during a cold, rainy night, or in the village clearing on balmy nights during the dry season. Each seemed to have several favorites. The Peruvian youth listened wide-eyed as various jungle hunters spun their tales: Awawa Xuko ("[largest] Toucan") spoke about a brief fight between jaguar and anteater; Natakoa ("Forest Man") told of a harpy eagle's catch of a howler monkey; and chief Xumu Nawa related a story about how, as a youth in company with the former chief Awawa Toto, they tracked a special band of howler monkeys.

Huni Kui traditions 
In addition to the hunting stories, Córdova heard about legendary scenes and mythic figures, and talk about social ceremonies which he later he witnessed. Learned were the tribal origins of the Huni Kui during a time when humans could talk with animals, and about how people did not die as they do now, but instead "Old men changed into boys, old women into girls". This was before the tribal loss of immortality. One narrative described the first war, started by wife-stealing; chief Xumu associated this with the tribe's recent misfortunes stemming from the invasion of commercial "rubber cutters" (Sp: "caucheros"). Another story told of the negative behavior suffered by a man named Macari, who had made improper use of ayahuasca.

The teenager Nawatoto (HK: "Hawk"), the son of Natakoa and his wife Yawanini, had become a good hunter and was deemed ready to marry by his parents, which was later affirmed by the elder chief Shumu (Xumu Nawa) and a group of older men and women. From a different segment of the Huni Kui a girl named Irikina was selected and the two families agreed. A brief marriage ceremony was later held, followed by a large tribal celebration involving a great feast, dancing, and drinking. After birth of the first child, the husband obtained his own hunting territory and the wife her own plot in the village garden.

Ayahuasca lore and icaros 

By private instruction, the elder chief Xumu trained Manuel Córdova using "a series of incredible sessions with the extract of the vision vine, nixi honi xuma" (i.e., ayahuasca). The idiom Huni Kui is a dialect of Amahuaca which is part of the Panoan languages. The word ayahuasca is Quechua: aya meaning "spirit", "ancestor", or "dead person"; and huasca signifying "vine". Xumu transmitted to Córdova the vital skills and customs of the tribe, regarding the use of ayahuasca, in addition to the chief's extraordinary knowledge of the plants of the jungle. During this introductory period, a private teaching session began in the morning and ended the next morning. They held outside the village once every eight days for a 'month', followed by a month off. Again Manuel was required to follow a strict dietary regime during the sessions. As the training lasted many months, Manuel at times became "nervous, high strung, and afraid of going insane" but the chief and his small group of elder women assuaged his fears. These sessions were held in a secluded place in the forest, especially selected and provisioned.

The chief closely supervised the preparation of the brew of ayahuasca vines and the important admixture of chacruna leaves. A particular type of chacruna used by chief Xumu, Psychotria viridis, was later favored by Córdova. Primarily ayahuasca, but either of these two plants, or their comibination, are also called yagé, among other names. Córdova learned the great care that must be taken in order to respectfully collect the ayahuasca vine (about the diameter of a wrist) and chacruna plants, then mash, mix, and cook these ingredients properly. Early on Xumu had assigned the tribe's expert, Nixi Xuma Waki ("Maker of the Vine Extract"), to instruct him how. Medical studies of these drugs have since demonstrated that the visionary effects of the ayahuasca and chacruna brew are produced mainly by the latter, with the former here enabling and enhancing the imaginative clarity. Hence the extraordinary experience produced was "the result of a synergetic mechanism of the chemicals present in two different plants, an example of the sophisticated pharma knowledge of the Amerindian shamans."

While secluded in a jungle clearing, united "through some telepathic code of ancient man" Córdova felt Xumu transmitting tribal knowledge. He received "accumulated wisdom of many generations of ancestral forest dwellers, tapping biological wisdom from some source unknown". The older chief coached the young Manuel in the use of his imagination, steering it so as to refine his perception, and guiding him so he'd intuit its utility. Plants were shown and identified, then visualized. Their particular health benefits and especially their healing properties were discussed; various plants were related to specific diseases and their symptoms, imparting the ability to make an herbal diagnosis. To the plants the chief sang his chants (called icaros), and taught many to Córdova, along with their meaning and healing effects. Later Córdova in his work as a curandero primarily relied on the icaros taught him by Xumu. Córdova also learned how to listen to the plants, especially to ayahuasca.

"In the case of mestizo Peruvian shamans, the ayahuasca plant, like other visionary plants, is itself the teacher of the aspiring shaman who, among other things, learns supernatural melodies or icaros from the plant." The special functional uses of different icaros are "as varied as the needs of the shaman". The key ayahuasca chants and songs "sway the sequence and content of the internal vision", remarked Córdova, who stated also, "This power once exerted, though perhaps subtle in its effect, does not easily disappear." "The icaros constitute the quintessence of shamanic power."

Hostilities, and firearms 

Signs of a hostile "encroachment on tribal hunting territory" were noticed. A search party discovered a "small camp of two houses" about "three days away from our village". Chief Xumu spoke to the heads of families about their past struggles against enemies. Preparations were made for a raid by a party of 25 men. The women painted the warriors' faces and bodies with a blue-black stain in finely drawn designs. At a meeting the tribe swore to make war, finger-tasting a liquid tobacco mixture. The raiding party, including Manuel, used bird calls as they approached near the hostile camp, and their scouts killed an enemy lookout. Yet as they entered the camp it was deserted. When the Huni Kui warriors returned home to the village, a victory celebration followed.

Eventually Manuel Córdova learned of the Huni Kui's past skirmishes and battles, including the names of several enemy tribes. Some forest neighbors had gotten hold of firearms which had given them a deadly advantage in warfare against the Huni Kui. Most significant, however, was the defeat of the Huni Kui by Brazilian caucheros armed with rifles, resulting in the loss of life, loss of captives, and loss of tribal territory which caused the tribe's migration. Much later Manuel heard the chief describe as a primary reason for his abduction from the caucho camp: to somehow obtain firearms for the Huni Kui.

Tribal trade in rubber 

Subtly prompted by the old tribal chief Xumu, the 17-year-old Manuel suddenly came to the realization that the Huni Kui could search for rubber trees in the forest, cut them down to collect the 'sap' and so obtain the valuable trade good: latex. With his help, the tribe could sell the rubber at a river trading post, and with the proceeds purchase firearms and implements. Because of his proposal, Manuel felt he had won some sense of control over his own future within the tribe, which gave "new meaning to life" and made him "inwardlly greatly excited". First Manuel worked with Huni Kui hunters to sharpen the dull metal and stone tools they had, in order to use them on the rubber trees. Manuel taught his tribe how. After many weeks a large stockpile of latex was collected which had been turned into 20 solid chunks each estimated to weigh over 20 kilos.

Xumu selected a tribal party to carry the rubber to trade, one chunk per man. They then traveled on foot to the frontier of their tribal lands and beyond through (what Manuel thought was) "trackless forest" moving northeast. Eventually they came to a stop close to a 'outpost' for the rubber trade, on the Río Purús in Brazil, just across the Peruvian border. There Córdova for the first time in years put on western clothes (ill-fitting, given him by the chief), and paddled alone aboard an improvised three-log raft loaded with chunks of latex to the river 'business office'. Indians were forbidden by law from purchasing firearms. Córdoba avoided the manager's inquisitive questions, and sold Rodrigues the harvested rubber at the going price, which was more than enough. He purchased a box of six rifles, two shotguns, ammunition, as well as other goods (axes, machetes, mirrors, and beads), and put on account his remaining credit balance. Córdoba saw a calendar: June 15, 1910; it had been two and a half years since his capture. When the party returned to the village, the whole tribe celebrated in its most grand style.

Soon after his return from the tribe's first caucho trading venture, Manuel Córdova married. Chief Shumu (Xumu) had selected Huaini (HK: "Fragrant Flower") and introduced the situation to Manuel. Of course, he already knew Huaini. They had first met shortly after his arrival in the village of Xanadá when he was exhausted and disoriented following his abduction; she was the girl who had then given Manuel a sweet banana drink. Their continuing "strong feeling of affection" for each other pleased the chief.

Chief Xumu and ayahuasca 

In the group ayahuasca sessions, the nature and timing of the visions seen by each member was significantly influenced by the purposeful chanting of the guide. The group would join in these songs, called icaros. In his guiding role, chief Xumu Nawa apparently employed different chants or icaros in order to steer and coordinate the subjective imaginations of individual tribal members, so that the ayahuasca sessions would become a shared experience among those participating. "Soon subtle but evocative chants led by the chief took control of the progression of our visions. Embellishments to both the chants and the visions came from the participants." An anthropologist of the upper Amazon wrote:

"Córdoba-Rios' account evokes for the reader the immense importance that plant hallucinogens can have among groups where they are centrally incorporated into all aspects of social life. [He] illustrates how non-literate groups... use the visionary effects of the plant to intensify perception of forest animals, their habits and peculiarities, and to increase their awareness of individual interactions within the group, thereby facilitating political control in the absence of formal leadership structures. ... The preparation and use of the plant is ritualized and accompanied by musical chants... [managed] by the guiding shaman to control the progression of visions and, in effect, to program them toward culturally-valued stereotypic patterns which aid in specific problems... ."

Lamb commented that chief Xumu led the Huni Kui "with great finess and subtlety, seeking consensus on every important action after long discussion with his people." His practice in guiding ayahuasca sessions with carefully timed icaros undoubtedly assisted his ability to persuade. When the hunters would gather to tell their tales of tracking and encountering game, Xumu might also recite a story of his own. Often he then would speak of the former chief, Awawa Toto. Chief Xumu employed these ayahuasca sessions to augment his authority.

"I sense, my friend", Córdova said to me, "that you find it difficult to grasp the significance of the influence that a maestro ayahuasquero has over the minds of a group of people who participate with him in a vision session of the kind I have described. This power once exerted, though perhaps subtle in its effect, does not easily disappear. As you know, in my youth I was held in its spell for several years."

Following chief Xumu's death, Córdoba followed his instructions and assumed the duties of tribal chief. Eventually he discovered, while conducting a group ayahuasca session, by using icaros, "that the visions obeyed the songs and chants, or perhaps it would be better to say that by means of the chants it was possible to influence the course of the visions". At the next ayahuasca session in which he guided tribal members, Córdoba tested his new understanding about the steering of the visions beheld by the group. He states, "I chanted what I wanted to see and found that each time... no matter how involved or strange the visions, they obeyed my wishes as I expressed them in song." Accordingly, his authority increased. "Once the men realized that I had achieved domination over their dreams, they considered me a true magician, a position superior to theirs."

Migrations of Huni Kui 
In the recent past, well before Córdova's arrival, the tribe had been living in settlements across the border, by the banks of a river in Brazil, the Tarauacá [HK: Hoonwa-ia]. Commercial rubber agents, however, began appearing in the vicinity. As these groups of caucheros increased in number, their frictions with the people of the forest might escalate. Some of these intruders began launching armed and murderous assaults against various native tribes, in particular, against the Huni Kui. Incapable of mounting an adequate defense, tribal subgroups under chief Xumu decided to move upriver to escape these aggressors, who killed and who also took captive women and children. Soon this new refuge was also attacked by rubber interests. In addition, neighboring tribes had gotten hold of modern firearms and thus gained an intolerable advantage in the recurring violence of intertribal warfare. While again migrating upriver to the west, a large boa was found and the refugees, taking it as good luck, named their subgroups the Donowan after the boa.

These Donowan continued upriver, to a more inaccessible location, one near the upland headwaters of several rivers; "they withdrew to this most isolated area away from navigable streams to avoid contact with the invading rubber cutters". In the process, they were joined by two local tribes (the Xabo and Ixabo: "Palm Tree" people) who also spoke the same Huni Kui language. Together they founded a new settlement which they named Xanadá ("Place to Begin Again"), led by Xumu their chief. Nonetheless, stored in the wounded tribal memory of the Huni Kui remained grievous, emotional scenes concerning family catastrophes, hence instinctual motivation to avenge the tribe's losses: the "murdered relatives and stolen children", and their former lands where they had hunted, tilled, and gathered.

Passing of chief Xumu 

The elderly tribal chief Xumu became ill and began to weaken further. He sat for days in his hut, attended by an inner group of elderly village women. At his passing, the tribe went into mourning. His body was prepared for burial by being washed and wrapped, then lifted up to the ceiling of the hut, where smoke from the fire is thick, which cured it for many months. All activity ceased. His life and guidance was fondly recalled; nostalgia gripped the Huni Kui. The tribe raised chants amid collective cries of lamentation. In remembrance people spoke of Xumu's leadership during the troubles and sorrows of the recent migrations. Later his stiffened body was oiled, so that his joints could be moved to put him in a sitting position; then he is placed into a large ceramic jar. His belonging are also put in, and food, and then a lid was sealed using melted tree resin. A ceremony was held in which the chief was buried at the edge of the village. Days passed; eventually the village's store of food became exhausted, and the communal activity of tribal life resumed.

Córdova's time as chief 
Chief Xumu's funeral ceremony was prepared quietly and then held by the tribe, with spontaneous mourning manifested. After a time, Córdova (Ino Moxo) was asked by the hunters to lead an ayahuasca session of 'group dreaming', in order to reinvigorate and sharpen their tracking and shooting skills. Over a year had passed since the tribe engaged in the rubber trade. Need arose for more machetes and other implements. Córdova managed the village work and the forest collection of latex, then its transport to the river trading post. Once there he went alone, as before, to sell the caucho and to buy the goods. Córdova learned the price of rubber had fallen by almost half.

Tribal festivities were held to celebrate the new purchases from their caucho trade. The days of drinking resulted and the usual feuds erupting among intoxicants. Córdova found it difficult to satisfactory settle the angry quarrels. Later he led another ayahuasca session, where his skills noticeably improved, as he used the chanting of icaros to orchestrate the group's flow of shared images. Tribal members came to consider the Ino Moxo a master at it. Eventually, new insights about the social life of the tribe allowed Códova to improve his ability to mediate the repetitive disputes. Córdova also was called upon to practice the art of healing he learned from chief Xumu. He began to place some reliance on an elderly woman, Owa Iuxabo (Old Mother). Yet other difficulties developed.

One group of Huni Kui, who appeared more violent by nature, had separated from the others, and was absent for many days. When they returned, a village woman hinted to Córdova that they had raided a camp of Peruvian rubber tappers in the vicinity, ignoring his prior instructions. Córdova (Ino Moxo) called a tobacco meeting with them in which he recalled his careful training by the former chief, and his own ability to get arms and trade goods. Without drama, he implied his knowledge of their raid, and that if they continued raiding "evil spirits and disastrous times would destroy the tribe". These members joined the discussion, saying many caucheros were now withdrawing from the neighboring forests; more importantly, they dwelled on the unavenged deaths and other losses suffered by the Huni Kui in the past. In the prior attacks by rubber cutters, women and children had been taken, others killed or went missing. The tribe had felt compelled to abandon its village and lands (see above "Migrations"). In reply Córdova, in order to re-establish social solidarity, selected a tribal party of 25 which travelled to where their former settlements had been, i.e., to where they had been driven out. When the party reached their old lands they found abandoned caucho camps. Córdova moved to quell talk of violent vengeance-seeking, warning it would likely provoke a devastating response by the more numerous, better-armed caucheros against their current home Xanadá. The party then returned home, where Córdova was told that enemy tribes had been probing the Huni Kui defenses.

Meanwhile, anonymous attempts continued to be made on Córdova's life; arrows were shot at him, but by whom remained a mystery: probably a rival tribe. The late chief Xumu had seen his only son fall victim to such deadly sniper attacks. During the tribe's next rubber-trade venture, Córdova found that latex prices continued to plummet, and that many commercial caucheros were leaving. Later, when an arrow almost hit Córdova while in the forest, the tribe became anxious and demanded that he remain in the village for protection. As if imprisoned there by his tribe, he began to feel a sense of foreboding. Córdova (Ino Moxo) then prepared himself alone for an ayahuasca session: therein he saw the deceased chief Xumu and the black jaguar; he also a vision his mother ill and dying.

Return to Iquitos 

Another cache of latex was collected and then a tribal party carried it overland to their destination: the trading post on the banks of the Río Purús. Halting nearby, they built a raft to float the latex the rest of the way; as usual, Córdova put on clothes and took the rubber in alone. Its price had continued its decline, and the latex had little of its expected value. Docked by the outpost was the Filó, a Brazilian launch. Rodrigues told him it would soon be leaving downriver. With some purchased utility goods, Córdova returned to the waiting tribal party. He then misdirected their attention by telling them that he must go again to buy new guns. Yet back at the jungle trading post the next morning, he instead booked passage on the Filó. It took him to Manaus on the middle course of the Amazon River; this city was the commercial capital of the Amazon rubber boom. At Manaus Córdova went to the offices of Luzero-Rodrigues da Costa & Companhia, where he collected the balance due on account. Here he avoided informing an elder Rodrigues of his seven years in captivity, keeping the world of the Huni Kui hidden and apart. From Manaus Córdova proceeded westward, up the Amazon River to Iquitos in Peru. There he found his father living in the same home, who greeted him with an abraço, but learned to his sadness that his mother and a sister had died recently in an influenza epidemic.

Although Córdoba later dreamt about his time with the forest tribe, he remained ambivalent about the incident of his capture and life with the tribe. Once back home in Iquitos he did not try to return to the Huni Kui. He did keep an ear open for news about the tribe. Eventually he would refer to the Huni Kui as his "Indian captors" but also as "my group of Indians" and "our village". Yet he offered reasons to justify his escape. "My early family ties had been strong, and for this reason I probably never completely gave up on the idea of escape and return." On the other hand, he said that "if conditions had been different I might have stayed on in the forest for a long time". The most important condition, among several major ones, was that "our enemies there in the forest [were trying] to assassinate me and thus eliminate the source of firearms for my group of Indians". Later, when discussing his remarkable ability to effect cures, Córdoba would give the credit to chief Xumu of the Huni Kui, who was "the single most important influence on the rest of his life".

Issue of authenticity 
Córdova's story of his capture by, and years among, an indigenous tribe of the Peruvian Amazon was initially welcomed in the anthropological literature. Indeed, it was praised and recommended. Richard Evans Schultes, the celebrated authority on plants and drug extracts, particularly of the Amazon, about the Córdoba's 1971 book, states: "The numerous references to plants used by Amazonian Indians and more especially the interesting data on the hallucinogen ayahuasca provide significant ethnobotanical information."

About a decade after Lamb's first book, however, the well-regarded anthropologist Robert L. Carneiro published a piece highly critical of Córdova. It appeared in a popular book of essays mostly about another's somewhat similar claims of being initiated into Native American shamanism (yet of a different culture, locale and method). The book's editor Richard de Mille was a noted sceptic. Carneiro presented a list of major social customs he had observed, or had been told about, the Amahuaca [tribes associated with the Huni Kui], which differed markedly from those related by Córdova. Among these traits: no tribal chief, no tribal 'villages', different 'clothes', different weapons, different tribal ceremonies, no 'tobacco-licking' oath, different care of the dead, cannibalism, and different myths.

Carneiro also quoted a letter he received from a university psychiatrist of Lima, who had "interviewed" the elderly Córdova when he was "seriously ill". The letter characterized him as a vain rustic, and a trickster. Not willing to commit to an absolute denial of authenticity, Carneiro nonetheless states that Córdova's story "consists of fragmentary ethnographic tidbits gleamed indiscriminately from many tribes and encased in a matrix of personal fantasy." Carneiro had earlier published about a half-dozen articles on the 'Amahuaca tribes' based on his on-site study of them conducted about 50 years after Córdova's reported experiences. Later Lamb claimed that Carneiro spent "a very short time (about eight weeks)" with the Amahuaca, but Huxley writes that Carneiro and his wife Gertrude Dole were there at least "two months" during a return visit.

Subsequently, the issue has been addressed by several different writers, with opinions divided. Jonathan Ott, an expert on entheogenic drugs including ayahuasca, recapitulates Carneiro's essay and seconds his conclusions. Nonetheless Ott later mentions Córdova positively as one of the mestizo ayahuasqueros who had left his "jungle home" yet "continued to practice shamanic healing in urban areas of Peru".

Lamb remained convinced of the truth of Córdova's account. During the 50 years between Córdova's capture and Carneiro's study, the Amahuaca tribes underwent radical social transformations, due to traumatic encounters with the modern world. Events during these 50 years were dramatic, as the Amazon rubber boom and other commercial penetration (e.g., subsequent oil production) caused sharp social disruption in the Peruvian Amazon: a catastrophic decline in Amahuaca tribal population, loss of most tribal lands, and cultural-economic assimilation.

Lamb also contends that from Córdova's book the Huni Kui tribe can be precisely determined from among neighboring tribes, but that Carneiro has instead incorrectly employed the ethnically ambiguous name of Amahuaca and so misidentified the Huni Kui, connecting them with other assorted tribes. Lamb criticized focus on the Amahuaca:

"Amahuaca, as it is used indiscriminately by many observers for various Panoan clans dwelling between the Río Juruá and Río Madre de Díos in Brazil and Peru, is a vague term with little meaning for designating any particular tribe or clan of Indians." "Whether or not [here the] Huni Kui can legitimately be called Amahuaca is difficult to determine... ."

Later Lamb pointed to a 1926 article, whose French author wrote professionally on Amazon tribes, where the Huni Kui were also called the Caxinaua and the Amahuaca. A current chapter "Huni Kuin (Kaxinawá)", in Povos Indígenas no Brasil, also identifies the Huni Kuin (with an added "n") as the Caxinauá or Kaxinawá. Yet the names of tribal peoples here (where some groups even now choose to remain hidden from moderns) retains an ambiguity due to ubiquitous conventions of self-naming.

"The first reports from travellers in the region contain a confusing mix of indigenous group names that persists even today. This stems from the fact that the names do not reflect a consensus between namer and named. The Pano namer calls (almost) all the others nawa, and himself and his kin huni kuin." "Huni Kuin [signifies] 'true humans'."

Lamb discusses, with multiple citations to anthropological literature, each of Carneiro's points about Huni Kui tribal customs: chiefs, village size, clothing, weapons, ceremonies, tobacco, funerals, cannibalism, and myths. He refers to Huxley's book about the Amahuaca, citing a description of a Rondowo village with fifty houses whose people were led by a curaca or tribal chief,

Later recognition 
His abilities as a healer had been demonstrated in the large number of people who had received successful cures, and in the subsequent steady demand for his medical services. Public recognition accumulated gradually. Eventually his patients included members of the elite, i.e., generals, admirals, a judge, a surgeon, an ambassador, and a former President of Peru. He was offered the position of Director of Medical Services by PetrolPeru, the state oil company, which he declined. Similarly declined: Professor of Medical Botany at the University of San Marcos in Lima. During what were Córdova's last years, a visitor to his home in Iquitos found him surprisingly fit in appearance, writing later that "he looked sixty, except for cataract-clouded eyes". On his 91st birthday he passed on.

Practice as a vegetalista 
Córdova in the Rio Tigre book mentions many times his sense of obligation, however difficult, to train an apprentice, to pass on to another the knowledge of medicinal plants he had received from chief Xumu of the Huni Kui. In a sense, the book's information about herbs and stories about his experience as a vegetalista, as well as his views about health care and his practice insights into the healing arts, function as a testament to his training by chief Xumu. Many descriptions his treatments and cures are referenced in the above section: "Herbalist and healer". During the period when the elder Córdova practiced his "Amazon medicine", several photographs of him were taken and later published (though of poor-resolution): one in the Rio Tigre book, taken in a forest hut with a village shaman; and two in César Calvo's 'novel': a serious portrait, and a smiling Córdova with pipe.

Botanico's healing arts 
"I could never turn suffering people away when I had it in my power to help." This was Córdova's stated understanding both of his desire to heal and of his obligation to aid others with his medicinal skill. Although opinionated about healthy living, Córdova's medical practice usually went beyond the psycho-somatic aspect of an illness. His patients were provided with herbal regimens and other cures that addressed their physical complaints. Yet he also mentioned an ability in what appears to be psychological transference, which worked ancillary to his somatic remedies effected by use of plant extracts. Hence Córdova could be very persuasive, possessing the gravitas to inspire another's confidence in him as a healer.

Many folk healers of the Amazon concentrate more on the psycho-somatic approach and, accordingly, might radiate "an aura of omnipotence" about their healing prowess. Although fortunate in his charisma as a folk healer, Córdova also had learned from his Amazon teachers a profound knowledge about which medicinal plant worked to cure a particular physical ailment. The Huni Kui were especially knowledgeable about herbal remedies. A French Catholic missionary priest Contant Tastevin, who had become familiar with the Huni Kui, wrote in a 1926 article: "They know all the remedies of the forest. Every leaf, stem and vine they know and use as remedies." He then listed as examples ten plants, each the Huni Kui used to cure a specific ailment. Among Amazon tribes the elder Córdova worked with and knew, he realized that his "former captors" the Huni Kui were perhaps the best herbalists. They "possess the complete knowledge of the forest plants", including the use of ayahuasca.

Córdova's basic approach was to listen carefully to the patient. They were asked to describe the ailment, including its likely first cause: what they were doing differently about the time it started. He would then examine the patient's general health and physical condition, and location of the illness. Thereafter, often in the evening, when quiet and composed, Córdova would visualize the patient's body as a whole, and identify the malfunctioning organ. In his youth he took ayahuasca to stimulate his perceptions and visualizations. Later in life, however, his prescriptive sense had developed with experience, and he no longer made and drank an ayahuasca brew. Once having grasped the patient's condition, an herbal cure would suggest itself to him. Then he carefully prepared the medicine from plants at hand, or from those specially gathered, and either applied it himself or instructed the patient in its use. Afterwards he would monitor the course of the herbal treatment along with the patient's diet.

As a 'modern' vegetalista Córdova understood that the healing properties possessed by medicinal plants might be explained by a scientific process similar to molecular biology. Yet he favored remedies made organically from plants, voicing opposition to use of "synthetic medicines", especially in "massive doses". Some such synthetic drugs could be poisonous to the natural body. In event of such a case, Córdova's first step might be to detoxify the patient.

Because some of his successful treatments followed failure by doctors trained in medical school, some patients referred to their cure as "miraculous". Córdova, however, would credit his method of approach, the plant remedy, and his follow through. His methodology consisted of: careful patient interviews, particularly about the origin of the symptoms, and physical examinations; his reflective study of the case to arrive at a proper diagnosis; purity and dedication in preparation of plant extracts; and attentive monitoring of the patient's response to administration of the herbal remedy. Key to his beneficial results was, he said, his early training received from the Huni Kui shaman-chief Xumu Nawa.

View of tribal spiritualities 
Córdova strongly disapproved of tribal sorcery and witchcraft, i.e., working to place a curse on another person and thereby cause harm. More than once he forcefully declared how such malfeasant designs often backfire, evoking a murderous response from those who felt injured or victimized by such cursing, or merely threatened. As a herbal healer Córdova was a pragmatist, who wanted to cure the people who came to him. He knew that some people and some tribes understood illness as the work of demons. To be effective in such cases, Córdova knew that a curandero (healer) must demonstrate that the putative demon has been removed. Hence, as part of the treatment, the sick person might be shown a thorn sucked from the afflicted body organ, which supposedly completed the 'magic' cure. Such an accommodating attitude also allowed Córdoba the ability to converse with different curacas of the tropical forest and later with folk healers in town.

His disapproval of popular sorcery did not mean that Córdova also rejected the healing practices of the forest and corollary tribal beliefs. Especially so regarding ayahuasca: its use could assist in finding herbal cures for people, and for other beneficial purposes. Córdova's long experience in jungle medicine had demonstrated to his satisfaction that some ayahuasquero procedures regularly worked to heal the sick. For that reason he esteemed and respected such ayahuasca practice when properly conducted. 

Accordingly, after his return to Peruvian life from the Huni Kui village, Córdova, when in the forest on other business, had noticed the presence of the ayahuasca vines. He eventually began to collect the several ingredients to brew ayahuasca, which he then carefully prepared. Thereafter, he conducted group ayahuasca sessions with the Chazúta, which energized and enlightened the tribal members. At this and later sessions elsewhere, Córdova led the group by using his chants and songs, learned from chief Xumu.

Córdoba seemed more or less able to acknowledge, and thus straddle, two worlds: tribal tradition and urban modernity. Among the benefits an ayahuasquero could provide, according to Córdova, were: (1) guidance of the taker of the drink, and (2) use of other herbs of the forest to heal the sick. Ayahuasca itself, Córdova understood, was not a medicinal plant for use in healing. Its use was for listening and seeing visions. "Ayahuasca, it tells you how, but by itself it cures nothing directly."

Although Córdova became locally famous as a practicing master in the use of ayahuasca's powers to find the remedy for a cure, apparently he did not claim a complete explanatory understanding of the extraordinary experience, i.e., exactly how in theory ayahuasca worked. He might at times offer mystical suggestions about its uncanny ability to lead him to a diagnosis and herbal prescription for patients. He also suggested purely biological functions initiated by ayahuasca, obscure functions which are little understood by science. Other times, supernatural origins might be mentioned, e.g., that the animals taught the secrets of the forest to ancient tribal shamans. Contemporary urban vegetalistas are said to be a counterpart to tribal religious leaders of the Amazon. Following the teachings of chief Xumu of the Huni Kui, Córdova continued to sing traditional icaros to the plants while he prepared his extracts. He remained convinced that chanting the forest songs medically enhanced, in a mystic way, the herbal remedies he was preparing.

Ayahuasca: diagnosis, remedy 

As part of his practice as a curandero in the Peruvian Amazon, following the initial interview of a patient with a difficult illness, Córdova would retire in the late evening to brew and drink ayahuasca, often witnessed by his wife Nieves. These nocturnal reflections allowed him to arrive at a correct medical diagnosis of the particular illness and then to identify the right herbal remedy for its treatment. Chief Xumu of the Huni Kui had taught him the subtleties of this technique of using ayahuasca. After years of practicing as an herbalist, Córdova realized that he had acquired sufficient experience in this technique as to be able to make a diagnosis and find the remedy without taking ayahuasca again.

The intensive medical training provided by Xumu included his regular guidance of Córdova's awareness while he was under the influence of ayahuasca. Córdova estimates he received from Xumu such lessons using ayahuasca approximately five hundred times. During these vision sessions, Xumu and others instructed him in the specific healing properties of each individual Amazon plant while Córdova was observing the plant, its appearance and identifying characteristics—either as Córdova saw the physical plant in the forest, or as Córdova saw the plant in ayahuasca vision.

Xumu further instructed Córdova how to approach symptoms: the purpose being to carefully understand the patient's body as a unitary field with energy flows, which the illness or disease upsets by obstructing the flow or otherwise disrupting the balance of the whole. Hence Córdova always paid primary attention to the symptoms of an ailment, whether observed by him directly or as described to him by the patient. Córdova relates that this procedure is advanced by ayahuasca in that by its use the curandero is able to peer directly inside the body of the patient and appraise overall health, the condition of specific organs, and the unitary balance of the energy flows, in order to reach a diagnosis.

According to Córdova, once he had arrived at an understanding of the nature of the patient's illness, e.g., its source in a particular organ of the body, and so made his medical diagnosis, there then occurred within his mental vision a remarkable phenomenon: the spontaneous appearance of the medicinal plant associated with its remedy and cure. This experience is not further explained by Córdova. Based on his rigorous and intensive training under chief Xumu, lasting many years, it is possible that Córdova absorbed Xumu's knowledge through something like rote learning. The anthropologist Luis Eduardo Luna mentions that there is a special, mystical process for transmission of knowledge from Amazon shaman to apprentice. Luna also states that the physical shape of a medicinal plant may provide a clue in ascertaining its properties as a remedy relative to a specific ailment. Nonetheless, a vegetalista's frank explanation remains simply that the vine ayahuasca does directly inform the healer of what medicinal plant is the best remedy. If so, here would remain a mystery inherent in Córdova's practice of the healing arts, as it constitutes a key element in a necessary procedure (identifying the plant remedy), which continues to elude an explicit, adequate, and thorough explanation using principles of modern medical science.

Context of medical science 

The herbs and plant extracts customary to the traditional healing arts of the tribes who inhabit the Amazon forests have earned worldwide renown for their medical properties. Pharmaceutical companies have become familiar with the potential of "enormous value" both to science and to modern medical practice of these new "discoveries".

"South American jungle tribes were the first to use curare which is so important to modern surgical techniques. Many types of rauwolfia were employed by jungle shamans centuries before our medical men thought of tranquilizers. Quinine and all the other antimalarial drugs have their origin in the forests of the Amazon."

During Córdova's lifetime and continuing until today, there remain many medical plants whose beneficial properties are little known, or whose molecular biology in effecting a cure is little understood. The traffic across the frontier between western scientific medicine and the practice of traditional medical cures (of the Amazon, but also of China, and of India) has greatly increased in recent times. In this context Córdova was one of the many pioneers.

"There seems to be a lot in common between my method of healing and that developed in the Orient using natural plants for treatment of illness. I understand that Japanese practices lean heavily on traditional Chinese healing techniques. I have had contact with American botanists and pharmaceutical investigators also, but... nothing ever comes back in exchange."Other American botanists, e.g., Richard Evans Schultes of Harvard University, have been very appreciative of the medical properties found in plants of the Amazon and their study, and of the Amazon practitioners of herbal medicine. Schultes is celebrated as the "father of contemporary ethnobotany". In the decades following 1939, Schultes did fieldwork in the Colombian Amazon region, north of Córdova. The two evidently never met. Cf., Schultes and Raffauf (1992) at 1–3, 4–15, 274–75; at 1 ("father" quote).

Córdova's approach to medical practice involved the view that the body works as a whole, in which sickness disrupts the harmonious flow of energy which gives us health. Accordingly, in western medical science his methods would probably be termed "alternative". Although the vegetalista uses plants for their healing power, the plant is understood to contain both a physical and a spiritual dimension. Only the former is acknowledged as scientific by western medicine, the latter might even be considered quackery. A plant's spirit, according to the ayahuasquero, responds to sounds especially the singing of icaros. Hence, the medicinal plant, which firstly acts through its properties as understood by molecular biology, when viewed alternatively secondly acts also as a carrier which conveys the curandero's icaro of healing energy to the patient. Regarding the plants, Córdova asks, "What good do you think my remedies would be if I didn't sing to them?"

Subject of novel, and poem 
In addition to the novel, and the long poem (both discussed below), Córdova in Wizard of the Upper Amazon may have been an indirect cause of the 1985 film The Emerald Forest.

Las tres mitades de Ino Moxo 

Manuel Córdova-Ríos (Ino Moxo) inspired a 1981 novel by the Peruvian poet and writer César Calvo Soriano, who was himself a native of the Peruvian Amazon. It was published in Iquitos. The Spanish novel's title in English translation is The Three-Halves of Ino Moxo.

The story told describes a pilgrimage to the shaman Ino Moxo, undertaken by author César Calvo and his fictional cousin César Soriano. Along the way appear associates Félix Insapillo and Iván. They first encounter several other shaman-curanderos of the region: Don Juan Testa, Don Hildebrando, Don Javier, and Juan González. The party continues their fictional journey to the remote refuge of an elderly Córdova (known here as Ino Moxo).

The novel appears based on very real people, yet they become transformed into literary characters who inhabit a poetic epic. Hence the work partakes somewhat of the new journalism or creative nonfiction. Although the book often reads like poetry, demonstrating at times an imaginative voyage through a shifting intersubjectivity, nonetheless mixed in are events from Peruvian history. The narrative is framed as factual. Over a dozen identified photographs are included, of local scenes and portraits of people, e.g., Córdova.

Ino Moxo, in interviews with the book's author, discusses matter-of-factly the sense of mystical surreality in the Amazon forest. He speaks of the psychological progression of his inner reality, as his life unfolded: from an urban youth in Iquitos to a work-camp in the Amazon forest where he was captured, followed by his adoption of tribal lifestyles. This last involved an interior-cosmic recalibration. An Amazonian artistry of visionary perception is layered with reportage from the region's troubled past: episodes of the violent conquest and ruin of native tribal communities during the rubber boom. Calvo thus portrays a double context of fundamental intercultural incomprehension. Yet Ino Moxo, by following his revered teacher the shaman Xumu, manages to transcend the historical contradictions. He both shares and contests the urban landscape of modernity now occupying a place in the Amazonian ecology, while cultivating his own healer's knowledge of forest mysteries. The medium of this transcendence is an imaginary realm of psychic connection and intrasubjective realization, which remains inscrutable and continuous, pathways in a labyrinth.

"The real world of Manuel Córdova" 
A long poem by W. S. Merwin (the recent United States Poet Laureate) offers a running account of the inner life of Córdova, starting with his capture, then his years living in the tribal village, ending with his return. His tribal captors brought him "into their own dream" after which "not one of his syllables touched any surface". The sessions of 'dreaming together' immediately helped his town feet maneuver in the forest according to "a mastered music never heard not even remembered except as a shared dream".

The chief led the dreaming, "his teacher's whispers and gestures had rendered his eyes and ears attuned to powers haunting plants and waters... ". Córdova's identity then became tribal, he "had gone with them into the dream flowing through the forest... ", and "he became all the chief taught him... he went into the dream further and it came out with him into the day and from then on it was all around him... ". Then a lone dream showed him "his family and his mother was dying... . " So, he escaped the forest tribe, returned, yet found "his mother was dead whatever he might need was somewhere that could not be said as though it had never existed".

Bibliography 
Primary
 Manuel Córdova-Rios and F. Bruce Lamb, Wizard of the Upper Amazon (New York: Atheneum 1971).
 F. Bruce Lamb, Wizard of the Upper Amazon. The story of Manuel Córdova-Rios (New York: Atheneum 1971; 2d ed., Houghton-Mifflin, Boston 1974; 3d ed., North Atlantic, Berkeley 1974, with foreword by Andrew Weil.
 Also published as: The Stolen Chief (London: Robert Hale 1972).
 Der weise Indio vom Amazonas (München: Scherz Verlag 1982).
 Der Magier vom Amazonas (Reinbeck bei Hamburg: Rawohlt Taschenbuch Verlag 1985).
 Un brujo del Alto Amazonas. La historia de Manuel Córdova-Ríos (Barcelona: Col. Terra Incognita 1998).
 La sciamano del Rio della Amazzoni. La storia di Manuel Córdova-Rios (Torino: Edizzioni L'Età dell'Acquerio 2007).
 F. Bruce Lamb, Rio Tigre and Beyond. The Amazon Jungle Medicine of Manuel Córdova (Berkeley: North Atlantic 1985).
 Au-Dela du Rio Tigre. L'histoire extraordinaire de Manuel Córdova-Ríos (Paris: Editions du Rocher 1997).
 Río Tigre y más allá. La medicina de la selva del Amazonas de Manuel Córdova (Madrid: José de Olañeta 2002).
 F. Bruce Lamb and Manuel Córdova-Rios, Kidnapped in the Amazon Jungle (Berkeley: North Atlantic 1994).

Secondary
 Robert L. Carneiro, "Chimera of the Upper Amazon" at 94–98, notes at 452–453, in Richard de Mille, editor, The Don Juan Papers (Santa Barbara: Ross-Erikson 1980, 1981).
 Marlene Dobkin de Ríos, [Review of Wizard of the Upper Amazon] in American Anthropologist 74/6: 1423–1424 (1972).
 Willard Johnson, "The most curious beasts in the forest", comprises the Preface at i–xvi to Lamb (1985).
 F. Bruce Lamb, "Wizard of the Upper Amazon as ethnography" in Current Anthropology 22/5: 577–580 (1981)a.
 F. Bruce Lamb, "Comment on Bock's review of The Don Juan Papers" in American Anthropologist 83/3: 641 (1981)b.
 Richard Evans Schultes, [Review of Wizard of the Upper Amazon] in Economic Botany 26: 197–198 (April 1972).
 Amanda Mignonne Smith, "From the rubber boom to Ayawaskha tourism. Shamanic initiation narratives and the comodification of Amazonia" in A Contracorriente 14/3:1-22 (2017).
 Andrew Weil, "Introduction" at v–xii to Wizard of the Upper Amazon (3d ed., 1974).
 Time magazine: [Review of Wizard of the Upper Amazon] at 97/10: 82 (March 8, 1971).

Tertiary
 Stephan V. Beyer, Singing to the Plants. A guide to mestizo shamanism in the Upper Amazon (Albuquerque: University of New Mexico Press 2009).
 Robert L. Carneiro, "The Amahuaca and the spirit world" in Ethnology 3: 6–11 (1964).
 Robert L. Carneiro, "Hunting and hunting magic among the Amahuaca of the Peruvian Montaña" in Ethnology 9: 331–341 (1970).
 Robert L. Carneiro, "What happened at the flashpoint? Conjectures on chiefdom formation at the very moment of conception" at 18–42, in E. Redmond, editor, Chiefdoms and Chieftaincy in the Americas (Gainesville: University Press of Florida 1998).
 Wade Davis, One River. Explorations and discoveries in the Amazon Rain Forest (New York: Touchstone 1997).
 Richard de Mille, "Ethnomethodallegory: Garfinkeling in the Wilderness" at 68–90, in his edited The Don Juan Papers (Santa Barbara: Ross-Erikson 1980, 1981).
 Marlene Dobkin de Ríos, Visionary Vine. Psychedelic healing in the Peruvian Amazon (San Francisco: Chandler 1972; reprint 1984, Waveland Press, Prospect Heights IL, as Visionary Vine. Hallucinogenic healing in the Peruvian Amazon.
 Gertrude E. Dole, "Amahuaca" at 7: 33–36, in Encyclopedia of World Culture, volume 7: South America, volume editor: Johannes Wilbert (New York: G. K. Hall 1994).
 Matthew Huxley and Cornell Capa, Farewell to Eden (New York: Harper and Row 1964). Huxley: text; Capa: photography.
 Eduardo Kohn, How Forests Think (University of California 2013).
 Luis Eduardo Luna and Pablo César Amaringo, Ayahuasca Visions. The religious iconography of a Peruvian shaman (Berkeley: North Atlantic 1991, 1999).
 Nicole Maxwell, Witch Doctor's Apprentice. Hunting for medicinal plants in the Amazon (Boston: Houghton Mifflin 1961; reprint: MJF, New York 1990).
 Terence McKenna, The Archaic Revival (New York: HarperOne 1991).
 Jonathan Ott, Pharmaotheon. Entheogenic drugs, their plant sources and history (Kennewick WA: Natural Products 1993; 2d ed. 1995).
 Richard Evans Schultes and Robert F. Raffauf, Vine of the Soul. Medicine men, their plants and rituals in the Colombian Amazonia (Oracle AZ: Synergetic Press 1992).
 Amanda M. Smith, Mapping the Amazon. Literary geography after the rubber boom (Liverpool University 2021). 
 Andrew Weil, The Natural Mind (Boston: Houghton-Mifflin 1972).

Literature
 César Calvo Soriano, Las tres mitades de Ino Moxo y otros brujos de la Amazonía (Iquitos: Proceso Editores 1981).
 Le tre metà di Ino Moxo e altri maghi verdi (Milano: Feltrinelli 1982).
 The Three Halves of Ino Moxo. The teachings of the Wizard of the Upper Amazon (Rochester VT: Inner Traditions 1995).
 W. S. Merwin, "The real world of Manuel Córdova" in his collection of poems Travels (New York: Knopf 1994), pp. 96–114.

See also 
 César Calvo Soriano
 Luis Eduardo Luna
 Pablo Amaringo
 Matthew Huxley
 Richard Evans Schultes
 Robert L. Carneiro
 Psychotria viridis
 Banisteriopsis caapi
 Ayahuasca
 Herbalist
 Vegetalista
 Curandero
 Iquitos
 Pucallpa
 Ucayali
 Peruvian Amazon
 Tapiche Ohara's Reserve
 The Emerald Forest
 The Storyteller

References and notes

External links 
Bob Corbett, Wizard of the Upper Amazon. The Story of Manuel Cordova Rios [book review].

1887 births
1978 deaths
Amazonas Region
Herbalists
Folk healers
Mestizo people
Peruvian non-fiction writers
20th-century non-fiction writers